Elliot Moose is a Canadian children's live-action-animated television series produced by Nelvana for TVOntario and Télé-Québec. The series was developed by Jed MacKay and produced by Marianne Culbert. It aired from September 6, 1999 until September 20, 2000, based on Andrea Beck's children's book series, Elliot Moose. 104 episodes were produced.

Plot
Elliot Moose features a young moose named Elliot who lives in a place called "the Big House". He goes on adventures with his friends Beaverton, Lionel, Socks, and Paisley.

Production
The series' stories were half animated and half live action, reflecting children's real world of play and their imaginary world. The music was composed by Bruce Ley and Jed MacKay.

Characters

Major 
Elliot (puppeteered by Charles P. Schott and voiced by Al Mukadam) is the protagonist of the series and the leader of the group. He is a young moose calf who wears a green shirt with a red star on it and loves going on adventures with his best friend Socks. His catchphrase is "Amazing!"
Socks (puppeteered by Alisa Walton and voiced by Ruby Smith-Merovitz) is Elliot's best friend. She is a purple monkey who wears a pink hat with a blue bow tie and buttons lined down and she becomes friends with Elliot as his sidekick.
Paisley (puppeteered by Heidimarie Guggie and voiced by Frannie Diggins) is a red bear who wears yellow shorts with suspenders and looks up to his researches.
Lionel (puppeteered by Stephen LaFrenie and voiced by Amos Crawley) is a yellow lion who has orders to show Elliot and his friends as the leader of the group.
Beaverton (puppetered by Mark Wallace and voiced by Keith Knight) is a dark brown beaver who loves wood and is part of the group.

Supporting 
Amy (voiced by Julie Lemieux) is a female anteater who is also part of the group. She only appears in the animated segments.
Mong (voiced by Amos Crawley) is the antagonist of the series. He is a greedy little mouse who only appears in the animated segments.

Cast

Live-action actors 
Charles P. Schott as Elliot Moose
Alisa Walton as Socks
Heidimarie Guggi as Paisley
Stephen LaFrenie as Lionel
Mark Wallace as Beaverton

Voice cast
Amos Crawley as Mong and Lionel
Al Mukadam as Elliot
Ruby Smith-Merovitz as Socks 
Lizzy Hanna as Drusilla Dragon
Julie Lemieux as Amy
Greg Spottiswood
Frannie Diggins as Paisley
Keith Knight as Beaverton
James Rankin

Telecast and home media
In Canada, the show was first introduced on September 6, 1999 with the final episode aired on September 20, 2000. Two years later, the show was premiered on PBS (as part of the Bookworm Bunch block) in the U.S.; reruns aired on Qubo from 2007 to 2010. The series was released by Kids Motion Entertainment on VHS and also by KaBoom! Entertainment on DVD, and as of 2022, the series is now streaming on Tubi.

Episodes
Note: The first and last episode segments are live-action, while the second and third episode segments are animated.

Season 1: 1999

Season 2: 2000

References

External links
 Nelvana Official Site
 

TVO original programming
Télé-Québec original programming
Television series by Nelvana
1999 Canadian television series debuts
2000 Canadian television series endings
1990s Canadian animated television series
1990s Canadian children's television series
2000s Canadian animated television series
2000s Canadian children's television series
Treehouse TV original programming
Canadian children's animated comedy television series
Canadian children's animated fantasy television series
Canadian television series with live action and animation
Canadian television shows based on children's books
Television series about deer and moose
Animated television series about children
Animated television series about monkeys
Animated television series about lions
Animated television series about bears
Canadian television shows featuring puppetry
Canadian preschool education television series
Animated preschool education television series
1990s preschool education television series
2000s preschool education television series
English-language television shows